(Foochow Romanized: Hók-chiăng; also romanized as Hokchia) is a county-level city of Fujian Province, China, it is under the administration of the prefecture-level city of Fuzhou.

Geography

Fuqing is located in the north-central part of Fujian's sea coast, south of Fuzhou and north of Putian. It has a long indented coast line on the Taiwan Strait, to the south of Fuzhou.

The northern part of the county-level city, including the city's central urban area, is in the valley of the Longjiang River. The southern part includes a number of peninsulas with highly indented coast.

Climate

Administrative division
Subdistricts:

Yuping Subdistrict - city center, and location of the city government
 Longshan Subdistrict 
 Longjiang Subdistrict
 Yinxi Subdistrict - western part of the main urban area
 Honglu Subdistrict
 Shizhu Subdistrict
 Yangxia Subdistrict

Towns:

Haikou, 
 Chengtou, 
 Nanling, 
 Longtian, 
 Jiangjing, 
 Gangtou, 
 Gaoshan, 
 Shabu, 
 Sanshan, 
 Donghan, 
 Yuxi (Yuki), 
 , 
 Xincuo, 
 Jiangyin, 
 Dongzhang, 
 Jingyang, 
 Yidu

Economy 
As of 2022, Fuqing's Nominal GDP was US$24.6 billion (CN￥160 billion), ranked 4th among county-level administrative units in Fujian province; its Nominal GDP per capita was US$17,702 (CN￥115,067).

Industries that contribute to GDP for 2017:

Total GDP:

Overseas Fuqing
Fuqing, as well as most of the rest of Fujian, is known for its large number of emigrants, or huaqiao. The first wave of emigration started in 1940s; most common destinations during that time were Indonesia, Singapore, and East Malaysia. Some became among the richest men in Southeast Asia, e.g. Sudono Salim (Salim Group), Hendra Rahardja, Rachman Halim (Gudang Garam), Henry Kwee Hian Liong (Pontiac Land Group).

Overseas Fuqingese assembled into associations for mutual support, including the International Association of Fuqing, Perkumpulan Fuqing (Indonesia), and Singapore Futsing Association.

Local dialect

Fuqing has its own dialect which is closely related to the Fuzhou dialect, although the two are mutually intelligible to quite a high extent. Since it is a hilly area where mountains used to isolate each village, there are many variations in the local dialects. Most of its people can also speak Mandarin, which is used in schools, businesses, and to communicate with people from different parts of the province. Songs sung in Fuqing dialect are available online.

Regional foods
Fuqing is located in the coastal hills, subtropical climate, warm and rainy, but the river is short and shallow. Rich in species while not rich in harvest. Therefore, the important staple food in Fuqing is sweet potato. Non-staple food is dominated by various marine food. Many traditional snacks are made from sweet potato and seafood.

Guangbing: Guangbing is a bread product that is baked and shaped like a sesame-seeded burger bun top. In 1562, the Japanese invaded Fujian province. General Qi Jiguang was charged to drive the invaders out of Fujian. In order not to let the meal time slow down their marching speed, General Qi invented a kind of bread which was shaped into a ring at that time, so his soldiers could wear a string of those breads around their neck. After the victory, the recipe of this bread product was spread throughout the province and named Guangbing after General Qi. Nowadays, there is no longer a hole in the center of a Guangbing.

Oyster Patties: Oyster patties are a fried snack made of rice flour (pulp), soya bean powder (pulp), oyster, pork, cabbage and seaweed.

Fish Ball: Fuqing fish balls are balls of fish mince made from eels, mackerel or freshwater fish, and sweet potato flour mixed evenly to make its wrappers. Inside, they contain the mince of pork or shrimp.

Sweet Potato Ball: Sweet potato balls have a wrapper made of starch and sweet potato flour. The mince is made of oyster, seaweed and pork. Sweet potato balls represent family reunion.

Seaweed Cake: Seaweed cakes are made of flour and seaweed, traditionally using a stone oven.

Festival and special customs
Fuqing has some special customs different from other areas in China, which reflects the local history and culture. Fuqing customs have four obvious influences:
 
(1) the legacy of ancient Yue;
(2) ancient Central Plains culture; 
(3) religion, especially Buddhism and Taoism; 
(4) in modern times, foreign culture

Spring Festival 
Unlike other areas of China, the top part of the couplets traditionally put up during the Chinese New Year are white, not red. It is said that in 1562 on New Year's Eve, when the Japanese invaded Fuqing, people had to escape shortly after putting up the Spring Festival couplets. Upon returning after General Qi Jiguang's victory, people changed the couplets from red, which represents joy and celebration, into green or added white on the top to mourn for their family and friends who had died in the conflict.

On the first day of the new year, people in Fuqing eat Xianmian, a extra-thin noodle with two duck eggs to represent longevity. In the local language, the pronunciation of duck egg is similar to "suppress chaos", so they represent peace and stability. The second day of the new year is the day to visit and comfort the family that lost their family members last year. Thus, people cannot visit the family where nobody died last year in that day, regarding such a visit as unlucky.

The Lantern Festival 
The main customs of the Lantern Festival include eating yuanxiao, dragon and lion dance, Shehuo, lantern riddles, stilt, boat, row, and walking on the Li Bridge.

Winter Solstice Festival 
The most important part of the winter solstice festival is making glutinous rice balls and preparing the red-orange and ten pairs of chopsticks. The red-orange stands for blessing and the ten pairs of chopsticks stand for family reunion. People also light a pair of red candles to represent prosperity.

Tomb-sweeping Day 
The essential part of the Qingming Festival is to offer sacrifices that are often made from paper, as well as fire incense and firecrackers in front of the tomb. After sweeping the tomb, people take some pine branches or flowers back home for good luck.

Transportation 
Fuqing is served by Fuqing railway station on the Fuzhou–Xiamen railway, situated south of the urban area. A second railway station, Fuqing West railway station on the Fuzhou–Xiamen high-speed railway, is currently under construction.

Notable people from Fuqing
Sudono Salim/Liem Sioe Liong (1916–2012), Indonesian businessman, billionaire. Founder of Salim Group
Sutanto Djuhar/ Liem Oen Kian (1928–2018), Indonesian and Chinese businessman. President of RongQiao Group
Cao Dewang (1946-), billionaire businessman, chairman of Fuyao Group, winner of Ernst & Young World Entrepreneur of the Year 2009
Chen Zhangliang (1961-), Former President of China Agricultural University, vice-governor of Guangxi Province
Tjoa Ing Hwie (1925-1985), Indonesian businessman, billionaire. Founder of Gudang Garam tbk. 
Goi Seng Hui (1949-), Singapore businessman, billionaire. Founder of Tee Yih Jia Group.
Xue Guoqiang (1951-), Lieutenant General for People's Liberation Army of the People's Republic of China
Oei Wie Gwan Indonesian Businessman, Founder of Djarum Clove Cigarette 
Wang Qingming (1948-), president of All-China Federation of Industry and Commerce
Han Guolong (1955-), Chinese businessman, billionaire. Founder of GuanCheng Group.
Chen Longji (1956-), Chinese businessman, billionaire. Investor.
Lin Dingqiang (1965-), Chinese businessman, billionaire. Owner of Jinhuichina. 
Kiki Barki/Kie Hwie Kie (1956-), Indonesian businessman, billionaire. Owner of Harum Energy.
Liem Toeng Ki/Tukiman Salim (1925-1995), Indonesian businessman, billionaire, former Owner of Suzuki Motor Indonesia.
Liem Hariyanto Wijaya Sarwono (1929-), Indonesian businessman, billionaire. Owner of Bumitama Agri.
Henry Kwee Hian Liong (?-1988), Indonesian&Singaporean businessman, Founder of Pontiac Land Group.
Ye Xianggao (1559–1627), Senior Grand Secretary of the Ming dynasty.
Ingen Ryūki (1592–1673), founder of the Ōbaku school of Zen Buddhism in Japan.
Hou Jianguo (born 1959), president of the Chinese Academy of Sciences
Wu Gan (born 1972), human rights activist
Zheng Xingjuan (born 1989), high jumper
Xu Yunli (born 1987), Chinese volleyball player, Olympic gold medalist at Rio 2016
Lin Li (born 1992), Chinese volleyball player, Olympic gold medalist at Rio 2016
Chen Daochun (born 1953), Chinese businessman, politician, Member of the Standing Committee of the National People's Congress.

References

External links

 福清市人民政府网站 - Fuqing Municipal Government

 
Cities in Fujian
County-level divisions of Fujian
Fuzhou